Owasco Airport  is a privately owned, public use airport located three nautical miles (6 km) northwest of the central business district of Moravia, a village in the Town of Moravia, Cayuga County, New York, United States.

It was formerly a private use airport with the FAA identifier NY92.

Facilities 
Owasco Airport covers an area of 52 acres (21 ha) at an elevation of 1,378 feet (420 m) above mean sea level. It has one runway designated 11/29 with a turf surface measuring 2,300 by 50 feet (701 x 15 m).

References

External links 
 

Airports in New York (state)
Buildings and structures in Cayuga County, New York
Transportation in Cayuga County, New York